The genealogies from Jesus College MS 20 are a medieval Welsh collection of genealogies preserved in a single manuscript, Oxford University, Bodleian Library, Jesus College, MS 20, folios 33r–41r. It presents the lineages of a number of medieval Welsh rulers, particularly those of south Wales. 
The manuscript was compiled in the late 14th century, but many genealogies are thought to be considerably older. The latest pedigrees to have been included in the tract are those of Llywelyn ab Iorwerth (d. 1240) and Rhys Gryg (d. 1234). It shares some material with the earlier Harleian genealogies.

See also
Harleian Genealogies
Bonedd Gwŷr y Gogledd

References

Secondary sources
Siddons, Michael. "Genealogies, Welsh." In Celtic Culture. A Historical Encyclopedia, ed. John T. Koch. 5 vols. Santa Barbara: ABC-Clio, 2006. pp. 800–2.

Editions
Egerton Phillimore and J. Gwenogfryn Evans (eds.). "Pedigrees from Jesus College MS. 20." Y Cymmrodor 8 (1887). pp. 77–92.
Online editions:
"Full-text resources for ‘Dark Age’ history", Keith Fitzpatrick-Matthews.
"Welsh Genealogies from Jesus College MS 20", Celtic Literature Collective.
Jesus 20 page 33r, Welsh Prose 1350-1425. Diplomatic edition.

Further reading
Bartrum, P.C. Early Welsh Genealogical Tracts. Cardiff: UWP, 1966. 
Thornton, David E. Kings, chronologies, and genealogies: studies in the political history of early medieval Ireland and Wales. Occasional publications of the Oxford Unit for Prosopographical Research 10. Oxford: Linacre College, Unit for Prosopographical Research, 2003.

External links
 Jesus College MS. 20 at the Early Manuscripts at Oxford University digitisation project
 Catalogue record for Jesus College MS. 20

Medieval Welsh literature
Medieval genealogies and succession lists of Wales
Medieval genealogies and succession lists
Medieval documents of Wales
Jesus College, Oxford